Cliff Hoofman (born June 23, 1943 in Judsonia, Arkansas) was a justice of the Arkansas Supreme Court being appointed to the position in 2012 his term ending at the end of 2014. He was reappointed to the Arkansas court of appeals in December 2014 by outgoing governor Mike Beebe.

Education 

Hoofman received his Bachelor of Science from the State College of Arkansas, now the University of Central Arkansas, in 1968, and his Juris Doctor from the University of Arkansas School of Law in 1972.

Legal career 

Hoofman served eight years in the state Senate and 20 years before that in the state House. He also worked in the attorney general's office during Beebe's tenure as attorney general from 2003 to 2007.

Service on Arkansas Supreme Court 
On November 21, 2012, Hoofman was appointed to the Arkansas Supreme Court by Governor Mike Beebe to replace Justice Robert L. Brown.

Personal life 
He lives in Enola, Arkansas.

References

External links

http://votesmart.org/candidate/biography/24541/cliff-hoofman#.VBIn7CwtCUk

1943 births
Living people
20th-century American lawyers
21st-century American judges
21st-century American lawyers
Arkansas state senators
Justices of the Arkansas Supreme Court
Baptists from Arkansas
Members of the Arkansas House of Representatives
People from North Little Rock, Arkansas
People from White County, Arkansas
University of Central Arkansas alumni
University of Arkansas School of Law alumni